Marmon Group is an American industrial holding company headquartered in Chicago, Illinois; founded by Jay Pritzker and Robert Pritzker in 1953 (as Colson Corporation), it has been held by the Berkshire Hathaway group since 2013. It owns companies that produce transportation equipment, electrical components and other industrial components, and companies that provide services in the construction and retail sectors. Tank car manufacturing is a significant part of its business, products which are sold through its subsidiaries Union Tank Car Company in the United States and Procor in Canada. Berkshire Hathaway, which owns the largest freight railroad carrier in North America, BNSF Railway, acquired controlling interest in Marmon in 2007 and became sole owner six years later.

Origin and history
In 1953, Jay Pritzker and Robert Pritzker acquired Colson Corporation, a struggling manufacturer of casters, bicycles, navy rockets, and wheelchairs with sales of $3 million. The name of the company was changed to Marmon Group in 1964, after the acquisition of Marmon-Herrington. Major acquisitions by Marmon Group have included Cerro Corporation (1976) and TransUnion (1981). In 2007, the Pritzker family sold a 60 percent interest in Marmon Group to Berkshire Hathaway, with plans for Berkshire to acquire the remaining 40% over the course of the next 5–6 years; the remaining minority stake was purchased by Berkshire in 2013.

Subsidiaries
The following is a list of subsidiaries of the Marmon Group: 

 Amarillo Gear Company LLC
 Amarillo Gear Service
 Amarillo Wind Machine LLC
 Anderson Copper and Brass Company LLC
 Astha Sterling Crane Plc (India)
 Procrane Sales Inc.
 Atlas Bolt & Screw Company LLC
 Big Red Rooster Flow
 Cable USA LLC
 Campbell Hausfield
 Cannon Equipment
 Catequip S.A.S and Cat'Serv S.A.R.L
 CCPI Europe Ltd
 Cerro Electrical Products
 Cerro E.M.S
 Cerro Fabricated Products LLC
 Cerro Flow Products LLC
 Cerro Plumbing Products
 Cerro Wire LLC
 Commercial Zone Products
 Comtran Cable LLC
 DCI-Artform
 Sloane Retail Solutions 
 Dekoron Unitherm LLC
 Dekoron Wire & Cable LLC
 Display Technologies LLC
 Dominioni
 Ecodyne Heat Exchangers LLC
 Ecodyne Ltd
 EcoWater Canada Ltd
 EcoWater Systems Europe
 EcoWater Systems LLC
 Eden
 Enersul Inc.
 Epuro
 EXSIF Worldwide Inc.
 Filtrex Technologies
 Focused Technology Solutions,Inc.
 Fontaine Commercial Trailer Inc.
 Fontaine Fifth Wheel Company
 Fontaine Modification Company
 Fontaine Spray Suppression Company
 Freo Group Pty Ltd (Australia)
 Gendon Polymer Services Inc.
 Graver Technologies LLC
 Graver Water Systems LLC
 Harbour Industries LLC
 Jomac Canada
 Joyce Crane
 Kentucky Trailer
 Koehler-Bright Star LLC
 KX Technologies LLC
 L.A. Darling Company LLC
 Leader Metal Industry Co. Ltd
 Lindenau Full Tank Services GmbH
 M/K Express Company LLC
 Marmon Aerospace & Defense, LLC, dba RSCC Aerospace and Defense 
 Marmon Foodservice Technologies, Inc.
 Cornelius
 Prince Castle
 Silver King
 Marmon Utility LLC (Hendrix)
 Hendrix Wire and Cable, Inc.
 Marmon Utility LLC (Kerite)
 Marmon/Keystone Canada Inc.
 Marmon/Keystone LLC
 Bushwick Metals LLC
 AZCO Steel
 Bushwick-Fisher Steel Company
 Bushwick-Koons Steel
 Tarco Steel  
 Future Metals LLC
 Marmon-Herrington Company
 McKenzie Valve & Machining LLC
 Midwest Plastic Fabricators
 Nylok LLC
 Owl Wire and Cable LLC
 Pan American Screw LLC
 Penn Aluminum International LLC
 Penn Machine Company LLC
 Perfection
 Procoves Industrie
 Project CSI
 Radiant-RSCC Speciality Cable Private Ltd (India)
 Railserve Inc.
 Ameritrack Rail
 RLS Press Fittings
 Robertson Inc.
 RSCC Wire & Cable LLC
 Sisu Axles Inc.
 Sonnax Transmission Company, Inc.
 Sterling Crane (North America)
 Store Opening Solutions LLC
 Streater LLC
 TE Wire & Cable LLC
 Thorco Industries LLC
 3Wire Group Inc.
 Trackmobile LLC
 Trade Fixtures LLC
 Transco Railway Products
 Triangle Suspension Systems Inc.
 TSE Brakes Inc.
 Tucker Safety Products
 Unarco Industries LLC
 Uni-Form Components Co.
 Union Tank Car Company
 Procor Ltd
 UTLX Company
 Webb Wheel Products
 Wells Lamont Industrial
 Wells Lamont Retail Group
 Western Builders Supply Inc.

References

https://www.kytrailer.com/News/Article/53/Berkshire-Hathaway-Completes-Acquisition-of-Alleghany-Corporation

External links
 Marmon Group

Electronics companies of the United States
Manufacturing companies based in Chicago
American companies established in 1953
Electronics companies established in 1953
Berkshire Hathaway
2013 mergers and acquisitions